Jesse James is a 1927 American silent Western film produced by Adolph Zukor and Jesse L. Lasky and released through Paramount Pictures. The film was directed by Lloyd Ingraham and starred cowboy star Fred Thomson whose wife Frances Marion wrote the scenario under the nom de plume Frank M. Clifton.

The film was a light approach on the life of the famous outlaw, Jesse James, and was not popular with a large segment of the audience. Jesse E. James, the outlaw's son, served as technical advisor on the film.

Cast
 Fred Thomson as Jesse James
 Nora Lane as Zerelda Mimms
 Montagu Love as Frederick Mimms
 Mary Carr as Mrs. Zerelda Samuels
 James Pierce as Frank James
 Harry Woods as Bob Ford
 William Courtright as Parson Bill
 Silver King the Horse as Fred Thomson's steed
 Ruby Fornes (uncredited)
 Johnny Downs as Jesse James as a boy (uncredited)

Preservation status
Both IMDB and Lost Film Files have this film as being a lost film while silentera.com states that "a print exists".

References

External links

 
 

1927 films
Lost American films
Films directed by Lloyd Ingraham
Paramount Pictures films
1927 Western (genre) films
American black-and-white films
Lost Western (genre) films
Films set in the 19th century
1920s historical films
American historical films
1927 lost films
Silent American Western (genre) films
Revisionist Western (genre) films
1920s American films